Ulen is a town in Center Township, Boone County, in the U.S. state of Indiana. The population was 117 at the 2010 census. The town is surrounded by the city of Lebanon.

History
The Ulen Country Club was established in 1924 and Ulen was incorporated as a town in 1929. It was named for Henry Ulen, an industrialist.  The Ulen Historic District was listed on the National Register of Historic Places in 2015.

Geography
Ulen is located at  (40.064213, -86.463431).

Demographics

2010 census
At the 2010 census there were 117 people, 49 households, and 40 families living in the town. The racial makup of the town was 100.0% White. Hispanic or Latino of any race were 0.9%.

Of the 49 households 24.5% had children under the age of 18 living with them, 75.5% were married couples living together, 6.1% had a female householder with no husband present, and 18.4% were non-families. 18.4% of households were one person and 10.2% were one person aged 65 or older. The average household size was 2.39 and the average family size was 2.70.

The median age in the town was 51.8 years. 19.7% of residents were under the age of 18; 4.3% were between the ages of 18 and 24; 11.2% were from 25 to 44; 38.5% were from 45 to 64; and 26.5% were 65 or older. The gender makeup of the town was 51.3% male and 48.7% female.

2000 census
At the 2000 census there were 123 people, 48 households, and 39 families living in the town. The racial makup of the town was 100.00% White.
Of the 48 households 25.0% had children under the age of 18 living with them, 79.2% were married couples living together, 2.1% had a female householder with no husband present, and 16.7% were non-families. 14.6% of households were one person and 6.3% were one person aged 65 or older. The average household size was 2.56 and the average family size was 2.85.

The age distribution was 22.8% under the age of 18, 5.7% from 18 to 24, 13.8% from 25 to 44, 31.7% from 45 to 64, and 26.0% 65 or older. The median age was 50 years. For every 100 females, there were 92.2 males. For every 100 females age 18 and over, there were 90.0 males.

The median household income was $57,083 and the median family income  was $56,667. Males had a median income of $0 versus $51,250 for females. The per capita income for the town was $41,557. None of the population and none of the families were below the poverty line.

References

Towns in Boone County, Indiana
Towns in Indiana
Indianapolis metropolitan area
1929 establishments in Indiana
Populated places established in 1929